Area code 321 is the area code serving Brevard County, Florida, Space Coast Region and Seminole County, Florida. The area code has been in use since November 1, 1999; it was assigned to Florida (instead of suburban Chicago) after a successful petition led by local resident Robert Osband to commemorate the Space Coast's impact on Brevard County. The code refers to the countdown sequence which has launched many spacecraft from Cape Canaveral.

When it was activated in 2000, area code 321 was used as an overlay for most of area code 407 in the Orlando area, except for the small portion of Volusia County that includes Deltona which was in 407 at the time (it is now in 386). However, no 321 numbers were issued in the 407 area from 2003 until 2015, when 321 numbers were issued for cell phones in Osceola, Orange, and Seminole counties due to high demand. With the 407/689 overlay, 321 remains frozen in the Orlando area with new 321 numbers again being assigned only in Brevard County.
 
Area code 321 is also the NPA used for SatCom Satellite Phone units. Harris/Caprock Corporation has maritime satellite calls going through its corporate call center in Melbourne.

This area code contains numbers using the central office code 988 (e.g. 988-0199), which could have created conflicts given the designation of 988 as a three-digit code for the National Suicide Prevention Lifeline. As a result, in 2020, the Federal Communications Commission ordered a total of 82 area codes, including 321, to transition to ten-digit dialing for customers in the 321-only area not overlaid by 407. Per the timeline set by the North American Numbering Plan Administrator, permissive dialing began April 24, 2021, and 10-digit dialing was required on October 24, 2021.

See also

List of Florida area codes
List of NANP area codes
North American Numbering Plan

References

External links

 Florida's Area Code History
How I Got My Own Area Code by Richard Cheshire, "The Cheshire Catalyst" 

321
321
Brevard County, Florida
Telecommunications-related introductions in 1999
1999 establishments in Florida